The former U.S. Post Office-Meriden Main, also known as Meriden Main Post Office, is located at 89 Colony Street in Meriden, Connecticut.  Built in 1907 and extended in 1932, it is a striking local example of Beaux Arts architecture.  The building was listed on the National Register of Historic Places in 1986.  It no longer houses the city's main post office, which is at 190 Center Street.

Description and history
Meriden's former post office is located on the east side of Colony Street on the northern fringe of downtown Meriden, at the southeast corner of Brooks Street.  It is a two-story masonry structure, with a steel frame set on a granite foundation, with walls finished in rusticated and dressed limestone,  The main facade is three bays wide, with a projecting center bay housing the entrance, flanked by tall fluted Corinthian columns. Windows on two levels are articulated by quoin blocks, and the entrance has an elaborate cornice with medallion.  The building is crowned by a modillioned cornice and stone parapet.  The interior lobby space features terrazzo marble flooring and heavy woodwork, with walls adorned by murals depicting Meriden's historic cites.

Construction of the building was authorized by Congress in 1907, and the building was completed in 1909 to a design by James Knox Taylor.  In 1932 a sympathetic addition was made to the rear by James Wetmore.  The building is a striking local example of Beaux Arts architecture, and one of the city's finest architectural landmarks.  It was vacant at the time of its listing on the National Register of Historic Places in 1986.

See also 
National Register of Historic Places listings in New Haven County, Connecticut
List of United States post offices

References 

Meridien
Beaux-Arts architecture in Connecticut
Government buildings completed in 1907
Buildings and structures in Meriden, Connecticut
National Register of Historic Places in New Haven County, Connecticut